Scrobipalpa deutschi is a moth in the family Gelechiidae. It was described by Peter Huemer and Ole Karsholt in 2010. It is found in Algeria and the southern Ural Mountains.

References

Scrobipalpa
Moths described in 2010